Tina Turner (born Anna Mae Bullock;  November 26, 1939) is an American-born and naturalized Swiss retired singer, dancer and actress. Widely referred to as the "Queen of Rock 'n' Roll", she rose to prominence as the lead singer of the Ike & Tina Turner Revue before launching a successful career as a solo performer.

Turner began her career with Ike Turner's Kings of Rhythm in 1957. Under the name Little Ann, she appeared on her first record, "Boxtop", in 1958. In 1960, she debuted as Tina Turner with the hit duet single "A Fool in Love". The duo Ike & Tina Turner became "one of the most formidable live acts in history". They released hits such as "It's Gonna Work Out Fine", "River Deep – Mountain High", "Proud Mary", and "Nutbush City Limits" before disbanding in 1976.

In the 1980s, Turner launched "one of the greatest comebacks in music history". Her 1984 multi-platinum album Private Dancer contained the hit song "What's Love Got to Do with It", which won the Grammy Award for Record of the Year and became her first and only number one song on the Billboard Hot 100. At age 44, she was the oldest female solo artist to top the Hot 100. Her chart success continued with "Better Be Good to Me", "Private Dancer", "We Don't Need Another Hero (Thunderdome)", "Typical Male", "The Best", "I Don't Wanna Fight", and "GoldenEye". During her Break Every Rule World Tour in 1988, she set a then-Guinness World Record for the largest paying audience (180,000) for a solo performer. 

Turner also acted in the films Tommy (1975), Mad Max Beyond Thunderdome (1985), and Last Action Hero (1993). In 1993, What's Love Got to Do with It, a biographical film adapted from her autobiography I, Tina: My Life Story, was released. In 2009, Turner retired after completing her Tina!: 50th Anniversary Tour, which is the 15th highest-grossing tour of the 2000s. In 2018, she became the subject of the jukebox musical Tina.

Having sold over 100 million records worldwide, Turner is one of the best-selling recording artists of all time. She has received 12 Grammy Awards, which include eight competitive awards, three Grammy Hall of Fame awards, and a Grammy Lifetime Achievement Award. She is the first black artist and first woman to be on the cover of Rolling Stone. Rolling Stone ranked her among the 100 Greatest Artists of All Time and the 100 Greatest Singers of All Time. Turner has a star on the Hollywood Walk of Fame and the St. Louis Walk of Fame. She has twice been inducted into the Rock and Roll Hall of Fame, with Ike Turner in 1991 and as a solo artist in 2021. She is also a 2005 recipient of the Kennedy Center Honors and Women of the Year award.

Early life
Tina Turner was born Anna Mae Bullock on November 26, 1939, in Brownsville, Tennessee, the youngest daughter of Zelma Priscilla (née Currie) and Floyd Richard Bullock. The family lived in the nearby rural unincorporated community of Nutbush, Tennessee, where her father worked as an overseer of the sharecroppers at Poindexter Farm on Highway 180; she later recalled picking cotton with her family at an early age. When she participated in the PBS series African American Lives 2 with Dr. Henry Louis Gates, he shared her genealogical DNA test estimates, which were predominantly African, approximately 33% European, and only 1% Native American. Previously, she believed she had a significant amount of Native American ancestry.

Bullock had two older sisters, Evelyn Juanita Currie and Ruby Alline Bullock, a songwriter. She is also the first cousin once removed of bluesman Eugene Bridges. As young children, the three sisters were separated when their parents relocated to Knoxville, Tennessee, to work at a defense facility during World War II. Bullock went to stay with her strict, religious paternal grandparents, Alex and Roxanna Bullock, who were deacon and deaconess at the Woodlawn Missionary Baptist Church. After the war, the sisters reunited with their parents and moved with them to Knoxville. Two years later, the family returned to Nutbush to live in the Flagg Grove community, where Bullock attended Flagg Grove Elementary School from first through eighth grade.

As a young girl, Bullock sang in the church choir at Nutbush's Spring Hill Baptist Church. When she was 11, her mother Zelma ran off without warning, seeking freedom from her abusive relationship with Floyd by relocating to St. Louis in 1950. Two years after her mother left the family, her father married another woman and moved to Detroit in 1952. Bullock and her sisters were sent to live with their maternal grandmother, Georgeanna Currie in Brownsville, Tennessee. She stated in her autobiography I, Tina that her parents had not loved her and she wasn't wanted. Zelma had planned to leave Floyd but stayed once she became pregnant. "She was a very young woman who didn't want another kid," Turner recalled.

As a teenager, Bullock worked as a domestic worker for the Henderson family. She was at the Henderson house when she was notified that her half-sister Evelyn had died in a car crash alongside her cousins Margaret and Vela Evans. A self-professed tomboy, Bullock joined both the cheerleading squad and the female basketball team at Carver High School in Brownsville, and "socialized every chance she got". When Bullock was 16, her grandmother died, so she went to live with her mother in St. Louis. She graduated from Sumner High School in 1958. After her graduation, Bullock worked as a nurse's aide at Barnes-Jewish Hospital.

Ike and Tina Turner

Origins: 1957–1960

Bullock and her sister began to frequent nightclubs in St. Louis and East St. Louis. She first saw Ike Turner perform with his band the Kings of Rhythm at the Manhattan Club in East St. Louis. Bullock was impressed by his talent, recalling that she "almost went into a trance" watching him play. She asked Turner to let her sing in his band despite the fact that few women had ever sung with him. Turner said he'd call her but never did. One night in 1957, she got hold of the microphone from Kings of Rhythm drummer Eugene Washington during an intermission and she sang the B.B. King blues ballad, "You Know I Love You". Upon hearing her sing, Turner asked her if she knew more songs. She sang the rest of the night and became a featured vocalist with his band. During this period, he taught her the finer points of vocal control and performance. Bullock's first recording was in 1958 under the name Little Ann on the single "Boxtop". She is credited as a vocalist on the record alongside Ike and fellow Kings of Rhythm singer Carlson Oliver.

In 1960, Turner wrote "A Fool in Love" for singer Art Lassiter. Bullock was to sing background with Lassiter's backing vocalists, the Artettes. Lassiter failed to show up for the recording session at Technisonic Studios. Since Turner already paid for the studio time, Bullock suggested to sing lead. He decided to use her to record a demo with the intention of erasing her vocals and adding Lassiter's at a later date. Local St. Louis disc jockey Dave Dixon convinced Turner to send the tape to Juggy Murray, president of R&B label Sue Records. Upon hearing the song, Murray was impressed with Bullock's vocals, later stating that "Tina sounded like screaming dirt. It was a funky sound." Murray bought the track and paid Turner a $25,000 advance for the recording and publishing rights. Murray also convinced Turner to make Bullock "the star of the show". Turner responded by renaming her "Tina" because it rhymed with Sheena; however, family and friends still called her Ann. He was inspired by Sheena, Queen of the Jungle and Nyoka the Jungle Girl to create her stage persona. Turner added his last name and trademarked the name as a form of protection, so that if Bullock left him like his previous singers had, he could replace her with another "Tina Turner".

Early success: 1960–1965
Bullock was introduced to the public as Tina Turner with the single "A Fool in Love" in July 1960. It reached No. 2 on the Hot R&B Sides chart and No. 27 on the Billboard Hot 100. Journalist Kurt Loder described the track as "the blackest record to ever creep into the white pop charts since Ray Charles's gospel-styled 'What'd I Say' that previous summer". Another single from the duo, "It's Gonna Work Out Fine", reached No. 14 on the Hot 100 and No. 2 on the R&B chart in 1961, earning them a Grammy nomination for Best Rock and Roll Performance. Singles released between 1960 and 1962 included the R&B hits "I Idolize You", "Poor Fool", and "Tra La La La La".

After the release of "A Fool in Love", Ike created the Ike & Tina Turner Revue, which included the Kings of Rhythm and a girl group, the Ikettes, as backing vocalists and dancers. He remained in the background as the bandleader. Ike put the entire revue through a rigorous touring schedule across the United States, performing 90 days straight in venues around the country. During the days of the Chitlin' Circuit, the Ike & Tina Turner Revue built a reputation as "one of the most hottest, most durable, and potentially most explosive of all R&B ensembles", rivaling the James Brown Revue in terms of musical spectacle. Due to their profitable performances, they were able to perform in front of desegregated audiences in southern clubs and hotels.

Between 1963 and 1965, the band toured constantly and produced moderately successful R&B singles. Turner's first credited single as a solo artist, "Too Many Ties That Bind"/"We Need an Understanding", was released from Ike's label Sonja Records in 1964. Another single by the duo, "You Can't Miss Nothing That You Never Had", reached No. 29 on the Billboard R&B chart. After their tenure at Sue Records, the duo signed with more than ten labels during the remainder of the decade, including Kent, Cenco, Tangerine, Pompeii, A&M, and Minit. In 1964, they signed with Loma Records, a subsidiary of Warner Bros. Records which was run by Bob Krasnow. Krasnow became their manager shortly after they left Sue Records. On the Warner Bros. label they achieved their first charting album with Live! The Ike & Tina Turner Show, peaking at No. 8 on the Billboard Hot R&B LPs chart in February 1965. Their singles "Tell Her I'm Not Home" released on Loma and "Good Bye, So Long" released on Modern Records were top 40 R&B hits in 1965.

Turner's profile was raised after several solo appearances on shows such as American Bandstand and Shindig!, while the entire revue appeared on Hollywood A Go-Go. In 1965, music producer Phil Spector attended an Ike & Tina Turner's show at a club on the Sunset Strip, and he invited them to appear in the concert film The Big T.N.T. Show.

Mainstream success: 1966–1975

Impressed by the duo's performance on The Big T.N.T. Show, Phil Spector was eager to produce Turner. Working out a deal with Ike & Tina Turner's manager Bob Krasnow, who was also head of Loma, Spector offered $20,000 for creative control over the sessions to produce Turner and have them released from their contract with Loma. They signed to Spector's Philles label in April 1966 after Turner had already recorded with him. Their first single on his label, "River Deep – Mountain High", was released in May 1966. Spector considered that record, with Turner's maximum energy over the "Wall of Sound", to be his best work. It was successful overseas, reaching No. 3 on the UK Singles Chart and No. 1 on Los 40 Principales in Spain, but it failed to go any higher than No. 88 on the Billboard Hot 100. The impact of the record gave Ike & Tina Turner an opening spot on the Rolling Stones UK tour in the fall of 1966. In November 1967, Turner became the first female artist and the first black artist to appear on the cover of Rolling Stone magazine.

The duo signed with Blue Thumb Records in 1968, releasing the album Outta Season in 1969. The album produced their charted cover of Otis Redding's "I've Been Loving You Too Long". Later that year they released The Hunter. The title track, Albert King's "The Hunter" earned Turner a Grammy nomination for Best Female R&B Vocal Performance. The success of the albums led to the revue headlining in Las Vegas where their shows were attended by a variety of celebrities including David Bowie, Sly Stone, Janis Joplin, Cher, James Brown, Ray Charles, Elton John, and Elvis Presley.

In the fall of 1969, Ike & Tina Turner's profile in their home country was raised after opening for the Rolling Stones on their US tour. They gained more exposure from performances on The Ed Sullivan Show, Playboy After Dark, and The Andy Williams Show. The duo released two albums in 1970, Come Together and Workin' Together. Their cover of "I Want to Take You Higher" peaked at No. 34 on the Hot 100 whereas the original by Sly and the Family Stone peaked four numbers below that position. The Come Together and Workin' Together albums marked a turning point in their careers in which they switched from their usual R&B repertoire to incorporate more rock tunes such as "Come Together", "Honky Tonk Woman" and "Get Back".

In early 1971, their cover of Creedence Clearwater Revival's "Proud Mary" became their biggest hit. The single reached No. 4 on the Hot 100 and sold more than a million copies, winning them a Grammy for Best R&B Performance by a Duo or Group. In July 1971, their live album, What You Hear Is What You Get, was released. It was recorded at Carnegie Hall and became their first certified Gold album. Later that year they had a top 40 R&B hit with "Ooh Poo Pah Doo". Their next three singles to chart, "I'm Yours (Use Me Anyway You Wanna)", "Up in Heah" and "Early One Morning" all peaked at No. 47 on the R&B chart.

In 1972, they opened Bolic Sound recording studio near their home in Inglewood. After Liberty was absorbed into United Artists Records, they were assigned to that label. Around this time, Turner began writing more songs. She wrote nine out of the ten tracks on their 1972 album Feel Good. Their 1973 hit single "Nutbush City Limits" (No. 22 Pop, No. 11 R&B), penned by Turner, reached No. 1 in Austria, No. 4 in the UK and the top 5 in several other countries. It was certified Silver by the BPI for selling a quarter of a million in the UK. As a result of their success, they received the Golden European Record Award, the first ever given, for selling more than one million records of "Nutbush City Limits" in Europe. Follow up hits include "Sweet Rhode Island Red" and "Sexy Ida" in 1974.

In 1974, the duo released the Grammy-nominated album The Gospel According to Ike & Tina, which was nominated for Best Soul Gospel Performance. Ike also received a solo nomination for his single "Father Alone" from the album. Turner's first solo album, Tina Turns the Country On!, earned her a nomination for Best R&B Vocal Performance, Female. That year, Turner filmed the rock opera Tommy in London. She played the Acid Queen, a drug-addicted prostitute; her performance was critically acclaimed. Shortly after filming wrapped, Turner appeared on Ann-Margret's TV special. Following the release of Tommy in 1975, another solo album by Turner was released titled Acid Queen. The album reached No. 39 on the Billboard R&B chart. It produced charting singles "Baby, Get It On" and a cover of Led Zeppelin's "Whole Lotta Love".

Split: 1976
By the mid-1970s, Ike was heavily addicted to cocaine, which hindered his relationship with Turner. In 1976, they headlined at the Waldorf Astoria New York and signed a television deal with CBS-TV. Ike made plans to leave United Artists Records for a five-year deal with Cream Records for $150,000 per year; the deal was to be signed on July 5. On July 1, the Turners flew from Los Angeles to Dallas, where the revue had a gig at the Downtown Dallas Statler Hilton. They got into a physical bloody altercation en route to the hotel. Shortly after arriving at the hotel, Turner fled from Ike with only 36 cents and a mobil card and later hid at the Ramada Inn across the freeway. She filed for divorce on July 27, and it was finalized on March 29, 1978. After their separation, United Artists released two more studio albums credited to the duo: Delilah's Power (1977) and Airwaves (1978).

Solo career

Early solo career: 1976–1983
In 1976 and 1977, Turner earned income by appearing on TV shows such as The Hollywood Squares, Donny & Marie, The Sonny & Cher Show and The Brady Bunch Hour. After her separation from Ike, lawsuits were mounting for cancelled Ike & Tina Turner gigs. Turner resumed touring to pay off her debts with finances given to her by United Artists executive Mike Stewart. In 1977, Turner re-emerged with a sexier image and costumes created by Bob Mackie. She headlined a series of cabaret shows at Caesars Palace in Las Vegas and took her act to smaller venues in the United States. Later that year, she embarked on her first solo concert tour in Australia.

In 1978, Turner released her third solo album, Rough, on United Artists with distribution in North America and Europe on EMI. That album, along with its 1979 follow-up, Love Explosion, which included a brief diversion to disco music, failed to chart, so United Artists Records and Turner parted ways. Without the premise of a hit record, she continued performing and headlined her second tour.

In 1979, Australian manager Roger Davies agreed to manage Turner after seeing her perform at the Fairmont Hotel in San Francisco. In early 1979, Turner worked in Italy as a regular performer on the Rete 1 TV series Luna Park, hosted by Pippo Baudo and Heather Parisi. Later that year, she embarked on a controversial five-week tour of South Africa during the apartheid regime. She later regretted the decision, stating that she was "naive about the politics in South Africa" at the time.

In October 1981, Rod Stewart attended Turner's show at the Ritz in New York City and invited her to perform "Hot Legs" with him on Saturday Night Live. In November, Turner opened for the Rolling Stones during their 1981 American Tour. Turner's recording of the Temptations' "Ball of Confusion" for the UK production team BEF became a hit in European dance clubs in 1982. In 1982, Turner appeared on the album "Music of Quality and Distinction Volume 1" by B.E.F., a side project of Heaven 17 singing "Ball of Confusion". She filmed a music video for "Ball of Confusion" that aired on the fledgling music video channel MTV, becoming one of the first black American artists to gain airtime on the channel. Also in 1982, Turner appeared as a special guest on Chuck Berry's television special performed at The Roxy in West Hollywood. The concert was released a year later on home video.

Career resurgence and superstardom: 1983–2000

Until 1983, Turner was considered a nostalgia act, performing mostly at hotel ballrooms and clubs in the United States. During her second stint at the Ritz, she signed with Capitol Records in 1983. In November 1983, she released her cover of Al Green's "Let's Stay Together" which was produced by B.E.F. It reached several European charts, including No. 6 in the UK. In the US, the song peaked at No. 26 on the Billboard Hot 100, No. 1 on the Hot Dance Club Songs, and No. 3 Hot Black Singles.

Following the single's surprise success, Capitol Records greenlit a studio album. Turner had two weeks to record her Private Dancer album, which was released in May 1984. It reached No. 3 on the Billboard 200 and No. 2 in the United Kingdom. Private Dancer was certified 5× Platinum in the United States, and sold 10 million copies worldwide, becoming her most successful album. Also in May 1984, Capitol issued the album's second single, "What's Love Got to Do with It"; the song had previously been recorded by the pop group Bucks Fizz. Following the album's release, Turner joined Lionel Richie as the opening act on his tour.

On September 1, 1984, Turner achieved her first and only No.1 on the Billboard Hot 100 with "What's Love Got to Do with It". The follow-up singles "Better Be Good to Me" and "Private Dancer" were both U.S. top 10 hits. Turner culminated her comeback when she won three Grammys at the 27th Annual Grammy Awards, including the Grammy Award for Record of the Year for "What's Love Got to Do with It". In February 1985, she embarked on her second world tour to support the Private Dancer album. Two nights were filmed at Birmingham, England's NEC Arena and later released as a concert on home video. During this time, she also contributed vocals to the USA for Africa benefit song "We Are the World".

Turner's success continued when she traveled to Australia to star opposite Mel Gibson in the 1985 post-apocalyptic film Mad Max Beyond Thunderdome. The movie provided her with her first acting role in ten years; she portrayed the glamorous Aunty Entity, the ruler of Bartertown. Upon release, critical response to her performance was generally positive. The film was a global success, grossing more than $36 million in the United States. Turner later received the NAACP Image Award for Outstanding Actress for her role in the film. She recorded two songs for the film, "We Don't Need Another Hero (Thunderdome)" and "One of the Living"; both became hits with the latter winning her a Grammy Award for Best Female Rock Vocal Performance. In July 1985, Turner performed at Live Aid alongside Mick Jagger. Their performance shocked observers when Jagger ripped her skirt off. Turner released a duet, "It's Only Love", with Bryan Adams. It was nominated for a Grammy Award, and the music video won an MTV Video Music Award for Best Stage Performance.

In 1986, Turner released her sixth solo album, Break Every Rule, which reached No. 1 in four countries and sold over five million copies worldwide within its first year of release. The album sold more than a million copies in the United States and Germany alone. The album featured the singles "Typical Male", "Two People", "What You Get Is What You See ", and the Grammy-winning "Back Where You Started". Prior to the album's release, Turner published her autobiography I, Tina, which became a bestseller. That year, she received a star on the Hollywood Walk of Fame. Her Break Every Rule World Tour, which began in March 1987 in Munich, Germany, was the third highest-grossing tour by a female artist in North America that year. Turner released the Tina Live in Europe album in April 1988, which won a Grammy Award for Best Female Rock Vocal Performance. After taking time off following the end of the tour, she emerged with the Foreign Affair album in 1989. It reached No. 1 in eight countries, including in the UK (5× Platinum), her first number one album there. The album sold over six million copies worldwide and included the international hit single "The Best ".

In 1990, Turner embarked on her Foreign Affair European Tour, which drew in nearly four million spectators—breaking the record for a European tour that was previously set by the Rolling Stones. Turner released her first greatest hits compilation Simply the Best in October 1990, which sold seven million copies worldwide. The album is her biggest seller in the UK, where it's certified 8× Platinum with more than two million copies sold.

In 1991, Ike & Tina Turner were inducted into the Rock and Roll Hall of Fame. Ike was incarcerated and Turner did not attend. Turner stated through her publicist that she was taking a leave of absence following her tour and she felt "emotionally unequipped to return to the U.S. and respond to the night of celebration in the manner she would want." Phil Spector accepted the award on their behalf.

In 1993, the semi-autobiographical film What's Love Got to Do with It was released. The film starred Angela Bassett as Tina Turner and Laurence Fishburne as Ike Turner; they received Best Actress and Best Actor Oscar nominations for their roles. While she was not heavily involved in the film, Turner contributed to the soundtrack for What's Love Got to Do with It, re-recording old songs and several new songs. The single "I Don't Wanna Fight" from the soundtrack was a top 10 hit in the U.S. and UK. Turner embarked on her What's Love? Tour in 1993, which visited primarily North America with a few shows in Australasia and Europe.

Turner returned to the studio in 1995, releasing "GoldenEye", which was written by Bono and the Edge of U2 for the James Bond film GoldenEye. Turner released the Wildest Dreams album in 1996 accompanied by her "Wildest Dreams Tour". Before celebrating her 60th birthday, Turner released the dance-infused song "When the Heartache Is Over" in September 1999 as the leading single from her tenth and final solo album, Twenty Four Seven. The success of the single and the following tour helped the album become certified Gold by the RIAA. The Twenty Four Seven Tour was the highest-grossing tour of 2000, grossing over $120 million. At a July 2000 concert in Zürich, Switzerland, Turner announced that she would retire at the end of the tour.

2000–present

In November 2004, Turner released All the Best, which debuted at No. 2 on the Billboard 200 albums chart in 2005, her highest charting album in the United States. The album went platinum in the U.S. three months after its release and reached platinum status in seven other countries, including the UK.

In December 2005, Turner was recognized by the Kennedy Center Honors at the John F. Kennedy Center for the Performing Arts in Washington, D.C. and was elected to join an elite group of entertainers.

Turner made a public comeback in February 2008 at the Grammy Awards, where she performed alongside Beyoncé. In addition, she won a Grammy as a featured artist on River: The Joni Letters. In October 2008, Turner embarked on her first tour in nearly ten years with the Tina!: 50th Anniversary Tour. In support of the tour, Turner released a greatest hits compilation. The tour was a huge success and became one of the best-selling tours of all time. In 2009, Turner officially retired from performing.

In April 2010, mainly due to an online campaign by fans of Rangers Football Club, Turner's 1989 hit, "The Best", returned to the UK singles chart, peaking at No. 9. This made Turner the first female recording artist in UK chart history to score top 40 hits in six consecutive decades (1960s–2010s). In 2011, Beyond's second album Children – With Children United in Prayer followed and charted again in Switzerland. Turner promoted the album by performing on TV shows in Germany and Switzerland. In April 2013, Turner appeared on the cover of the German issue of Vogue magazine at the age of 73, becoming the oldest person to be featured on the cover of Vogue. In February 2014, Parlophone Records released a new compilation titled Love Songs.

Turner announced in December 2016 that she had been working on Tina, a musical based on her life story, in collaboration with Phyllida Lloyd and Stage Entertainment. The show opened at the Aldwych Theatre in London in April 2018 with Adrienne Warren in the lead role. Warren reprised her role on Broadway in the fall of 2019.

Turner received the 2018 Grammy Lifetime Achievement Award and her second memoir, My Love Story, was released in October 2018. In 2020, she came out of retirement to collaborate with Norwegian producer Kygo on a remix of "What's Love Got to Do with It". With this release, she became the first artist to have a top 40 hit in seven consecutive decades in the UK.

In 2020, Turner released her third book Happiness Becomes You: A Guide to Changing Your Life for Good. She co-wrote the book with American author Taro Gold and Swiss singer Regula Curti. It was chosen by Amazon's editors as a Best Nonfiction book of 2020. In 2021, Turner appeared in the documentary film Tina directed by Dan Lindsay and T.J. Martin.

In October 2021, Turner sold her music rights to BMG Rights Management for an estimated $50 million, with Warner Music still handling distribution of her music. Later that month, Turner was inducted into the Rock & Roll Hall of Fame as a solo artist accepting her award via satellite from her home in Zurich, Switzerland.

Personal life

Relationships and marriages

Early relationships
While still in Brownsville, Turner (then called Ann Bullock) fell in love for the first time with Harry Taylor. They met at a high school basketball game. Taylor initially attended a different school, but he relocated to be near her. In 1986, she told Rolling Stone: "Harry was real popular and had tons of girlfriends, but eventually I got him, and we went steady for a year." Their relationship ended after she discovered that Taylor had married another girl who was expecting his child.

After moving to St. Louis, Bullock and her sister Alline became acquainted with Ike Turner's Kings of Rhythm. Alline was dating the band's drummer Eugene Washington and Bullock began dating the saxophonist Raymond Hill. After she became pregnant during her senior year of high school, she moved in with Hill, who lived with Ike Turner. She recalled, "I didn't love him as much as I'd loved Harry. But he was good-looking. I thought, 'My baby’s going to be beautiful.'" Their relationship ended after Hill broke his ankle during a wrestling match with Kings of Rhythm singer Carlson Oliver. Hill returned to his hometown of Clarksdale before their son Craig was born in August 1958, leaving Bullock to become a single parent.

Ike Turner

Turner likened her early relationship with Ike Turner to that of a "brother and sister from another lifetime." They were platonic friends from the time they met in 1957 until 1960. Their affair began while Ike was with his live-in girlfriend Lorraine Taylor. They had sex when she went to sleep with him after another musician threatened to go into her room.

After recording "A Fool In Love", Turner told Ike that she didn't want to continue their relationship; he responded by striking her in the head with a wooden shoe stretcher. Turner recalled that this incident was the first time he "instilled fear" in her, but she decided to stay with him because she "really did care about him". After the birth of their son Ronnie in October 1960, they moved to Los Angeles in 1962 and married in Tijuana. In 1963, Ike purchased a house in the View Park area. They brought their son Ronnie, Turner's son Craig, and Ike's two sons with Lorraine (Ike Jr. and Michael) from St. Louis to live with them. She later revealed in I, Tina that Ike was abusive and promiscuous throughout their marriage, which led to her suicide attempt in 1968 by overdosing on Valium pills. She said, "It was my relationship with Ike that made me most unhappy. At first, I had really been in love with him. Look what he'd done for me. But he was totally unpredictable." Ike was later diagnosed with bipolar disorder in his old age.

Turner abruptly left Ike after they got into a fight on their way to the Dallas Statler Hilton on July 1, 1976. She fled with only 36 cents and a Mobil credit card in her pocket to the Ramada Inn across the freeway. On July 27, Turner filed for divorce on the grounds of irreconcilable differences. Her divorce petition asked for $4,000 a month in alimony, $1,000 a month in child support, and custody of her sons Craig and Ronnie. The divorce was finalized on March 29, 1978. In the final divorce decree, Turner took responsibility for missed concert dates as well as an IRS lien. Turner retained songwriter royalties from songs she had written, but Ike got the publishing royalties for his compositions and hers. She also kept her two Jaguar Cars, furs and jewelry along with her stage name. Turner gave Ike her share of their Bolic Sound recording studio, publishing companies, real estate, and he kept his four cars. Several promoters lost money and sued to recoup their losses. For almost two years, she received food stamps and played small clubs to pay off debts.

Ike Turner stated on several occasions that he was never officially married to Turner because he was legally married to another woman at the time of their ceremony. However they had a common-law marriage and still had to go through a formal divorce. He also stated that her birth name was Martha Nell Bullock (not Anna Mae Bullock). She signed her legal name as Martha Nell Turner on multiple contracts.

In his autobiography Takin' Back My Name, Ike Turner stated: "Sure, I've slapped Tina. We had fights and there have been times when I punched her to the ground without thinking. But I never beat her." In a 1999 interview on The Roseanne Show, Roseanne Barr urged Ike to publicly apologize to Turner. In 2007, Ike told Jet that he still loved her and he had written a letter apologizing for "putting her and the kids through that kind of stuff", but he never sent it. After his death on December 12, 2007, Turner issued a brief statement through her spokesperson: "Tina hasn't had any contact with Ike in more than 30 years. No further comment will be made." Turner's sister Alline still considered Ike her brother-in-law and attended his funeral. Phil Spector criticized Tina Turner at the funeral. Turner told The Sunday Times in 2018 that "as an old person, I have forgiven him, but I would not work with him. He asked for one more tour with me, and I said, 'No, absolutely not.' Ike wasn't someone you could forgive and allow him back in."

Erwin Bach
In 1986, Turner met German music executive Erwin Bach, who was sent by her European record label (EMI) to greet Turner at Düsseldorf Airport. Bach is over sixteen years her junior; he was born on January 24, 1956, in Cologne, Germany. Initially friends, they began dating later that year. In July 2013, after a 27-year romantic relationship, they married in a civil ceremony on the banks of Lake Zurich in Küsnacht, Switzerland.

Children
Turner had two biological sons, one with Raymond Hill and the other with Ike Turner. She also adopted two of Ike Turner's children, raising them as her own.

Turner was 18 years of age when she gave birth to her eldest son Raymond Craig in on August 20, 1958. His biological father was Kings of Rhythm saxophonist Raymond Hill. He was adopted by Ike Turner and his name was changed to Craig Raymond Turner. He was found dead in an apparent suicide in July 2018 . 

Turner's younger son, Ronald "Ronnie" Renelle Turner, was born on October 27, 1960. He played bass guitar in a band called Manufactured Funk with songwriter and musician Patrick Moten, as well as both of his parents' bands. Through him, Turner has two grandchildren. He was married to French singer Afida Turner. Ronnie died from complications of colon cancer in December 2022. 

During Turner's divorce trial, Ike sent their four sons to live with Turner and gave her money for one month's rent. Ike Turner Jr. worked as a sound engineer at Bolic Sound and briefly for Turner after her divorce, later winning a Grammy Award for producing his father's album Risin' with the Blues. He toured with former Ikette Randi Love as Sweet Randi Love and the Love Thang Band. Ike Turner Jr. stated that he and his brothers have a distant relationship with their mother (Tina). Turner wrote in her autobiography I, Tina that after her divorce she became "a little bit estranged" from all her sons except Craig. Turner told TV Week that "she's still there for the boys" in 1989, but there have been reports in recent years of her estrangement from her sons.

Religion
Turner has sometimes referred to herself as a "Buddhist–Baptist", alluding to her upbringing in the Baptist church where her father was a deacon and her later conversion to Buddhism as an adult. In a 2016 interview with Lion's Roar magazine, she declared, "I consider myself a Buddhist." The February 15, 1979, issue of Jet magazine featured Turner with her Buddhist altar on the cover. Turner has credited the Liturgy of Nichiren Daishonin and Soka Gakkai International for her introduction to spiritual knowledge.

Turner stated in her 1986 autobiography I, Tina that she was introduced to Nichiren Buddhism by Ike Turner's friend, Valerie Bishop, who taught her the chant nam-myōhō-renge-kyō in 1973. Turner later stated in her 2020 spiritual memoir Happiness Becomes You that her son, Ronnie Turner, first suggested she might benefit from chanting. Turner practiced Buddhism with her neighborhood Soka Gakkai International chanting group. After chanting, Turner noticed positive changes in her life which she attributed to her newfound spiritual practice. "I realized that I had within me everyone I needed to change my life for the better," she said. During the hardest times of her life, Turner chanted four hours per day, and although she no longer chants as much she still maintains a daily practice. Turner likened Buddhist chanting to singing: "…Nam-myoho-renge-kyo is like a song. In the Soka Gakkai tradition, we are taught how to sing it. It is a sound and a rhythm and it touches a place inside you. That place we try to reach is the subconscious mind. I believe that is the highest place…". Dramatizations of Turner chanting were included both in the 1993 film What's Love Got to Do with It and in the 2021 documentary film Tina.

Turner met with the 14th Dalai Lama Tenzin Gyatso in Einsiedeln, Switzerland, on August 2, 2005. She also met with Swiss-Tibetan Buddhist singer Dechen Shak-Dagsay and in 2009 co-created a spiritual music project with Shak-Dagsay and Swiss singer Regula Curti called Beyond.

Residences and citizenship
Turner began living at Château Algonquin in Küsnacht on the shore of Lake Zurich in 1994. Turner previously owned property in Cologne, London, and Los Angeles, and a villa on the French Riviera named Anna Fleur.

In 2013, Turner applied for Swiss citizenship, stating she would relinquish her U.S. citizenship. In April, she undertook a mandatory citizenship test which included advanced knowledge of German (the official language of the canton of Zürich) and of Swiss history. On April 22, 2013, she became a citizen of Switzerland and was issued a Swiss passport. Turner signed the paperwork to relinquish her American citizenship at the U.S. embassy in Bern on October 24, 2013.

In January 2022, Turner and her husband purchased a $76 million waterfront estate overlooking Lake Zurich at the eastern border of Stäfa.

Health 
Turner revealed in her 2018 memoir My Love Story that she has suffered life-threatening illnesses. In 2013, three weeks after her wedding to Erwin Bach, she suffered a stroke and had to learn to walk again. In 2016, she was diagnosed with intestinal cancer. Turner opted for homeopathic remedies to treat her high blood pressure. Her hypertension resulted in damage to her kidneys and eventual kidney failure. Her chances of receiving a kidney were low, and she was urged to start dialysis. She considered assisted suicide and signed up to be a member of Exit, but Bach offered to donate a kidney for her transplant. Turner had kidney transplant surgery on April 7, 2017.

Musical legacy and accolades
Often referred to as "The Queen of Rock and Roll", Turner is considered one of the greatest singers of all time. She is noted for her "swagger, sensuality, gravelly vocals and unstoppable energy", along with her career longevity and her famous legs. Journalist Kurt Loder asserted that Turner's voice combined "the emotional force of the great blues singers with a sheer, wallpaper-peeling power that seemed made to order for the age of amplification."

Daphne A. Brooks, a scholar of African American studies, wrote for The Guardian:Turner merged sound and movement at a critical turning point in rock history, navigating and reflecting back the technological innovations of a new pop-music era in the 60s and 70s. She catapulted herself to the forefront of a musical revolution that had long marginalized and overlooked the pioneering contributions of African American women and then remade herself again at an age when most pop musicians were hitting the oldies circuit. Turner's musical character has always been a charged combination of mystery as well as light, melancholy mixed with a ferocious vitality that often flirted with danger.

Awards, honors, and achievements 

Turner previously held a Guinness World Record for the largest paying audience (180,000 in 1988) for a solo performer.

In the UK, Turner is the first artist to have a top 40 hit in seven consecutive decades; she has a total of 35 UK top 40 hits. She has sold over 100 million records worldwide, including certified RIAA album sales of 10 million.

Turner has won a total of 12 Grammy Awards. These awards include eight competitive Grammy Awards; she shares the record (with Pat Benatar) for most awards given for Best Female Rock Vocal Performance. Three of her recordings, "River Deep – Mountain High" (1999), "Proud Mary" (2003), and "What's Love Got to Do with It" (2012) are in the Grammy Hall of Fame. Turner is the only female artist to win a Grammy in the pop, rock, and R&B fields. Turner received a Grammy Lifetime Achievement Award in 2018. Turner also won Grammys as a member of USA for Africa, and as a performer at the 1986 Princes Trust concert.

Turner received a star on the Hollywood Walk of Fame in 1986, and a star on the St. Louis Walk of Fame in 1991. She was inducted into the Rock and Roll Hall of Fame as a duo with Ike Turner in 1991.

In 2005, Turner received the prestigious Kennedy Center Honors. President George W. Bush commented on her "natural skill, the energy, and sensuality," and referred to her legs as "the most famous in show business." Several artists paid tribute to her that night including Melissa Etheridge (performing "River Deep – Mountain High"), Queen Latifah (performing "What's Love Got to Do with It"), Beyoncé (performing "Proud Mary"), and Al Green (performing "Let's Stay Together"). Oprah Winfrey stated, "We don't need another hero. We need more heroines like you, Tina. You make me proud to spell my name w-o-m-a-n."

In 2021, Turner was inducted by Angela Bassett into the Rock & Roll Hall of Fame as a solo artist. Keith Urban and H.E.R. performed "It’s Only Love", Mickey Guyton performed "What’s Love Got to Do with It", and Christina Aguilera performed "River Deep – Mountain High."

Turner has also received the following honors:
 1967: Turner was the first black artist and first female on the cover of Rolling Stone magazine (Issue No. 2).
 1993: World Music Awards presented Turner with the Legend Award.
 1993: Essence Awards honored Turner with the Living Legend Award.
 1996: Turner received the accolade of Légion d'Honneur from the French education minister.
 1999: Turner ranked No.2 on VH1's list of 100 Greatest Women of Rock and Roll.
 2002: Tennessee State Route 19 between Brownsville and Nutbush was named "Tina Turner Highway".
 2003: Rolling Stone ranked Proud Mary: The Best of Ike & Tina Turner  No. 212 on their list of the 500 Greatest Albums of All Time (No. 214 on 2012 revised list).
 2004: People ranked her 1985 performance of "What's Love Got to Do With It" as one of the top 10 Grammy moments.
 2008: Rolling Stone ranked Turner No. 17 on their list of the 100 Greatest Singers of All Time.
 2009: Time ranked her 1985 performance of "What's Love Got to Do With It" as one of the top 10 Grammy moments.
 2010: Rolling Stone ranked Turner No. 63 on their list of the 100 Greatest Artists of All Time.
 2013: Turner covered Vogue Germany, becoming the oldest person (aged 73) to cover Vogue magazine, surpassing Meryl Streep (aged 62) who covered American Vogue in 2012.
 2013: ABC ranked her No. 2 on their list of the 30 greatest women in music.
 2014: Turner was inducted into the Soul Music Hall of Fame.
 2015: Rolling Stone ranked Ike & Tina Turner No. 2 on their list of the 20 Greatest Duos of All Time.
 2015: Ike & Tina Turner were inducted into the St. Louis Classic Rock Hall of Fame.
 2016: An image of Turner taken by Jack Robinson in 1969 was used as the cover for The Last Shadow Puppets album Everything You've Come to Expect.
 2019: Turner was inducted into the Memphis Music Hall of Fame.
 2020: Private Dancer was added to the National Recording Registry at the Library of Congress.
 2021: Turner became a two-time Rock and Roll Hall of Fame inductee.
 2021: Turner received an honorary doctorate for her "unique musical and artistic life's work" from the Philosophical and Historical Faculty of the University of Bern.
 2022: Mattel released a Barbie doll in Turner's likeness to commemorate her single "What's Love Got To Do With It."

Discography

Studio albums
 Tina Turns the Country On! (1974) 
 Acid Queen (1975)
 Rough (1978)
 Love Explosion (1979)
 Private Dancer (1984)
 Break Every Rule (1986)
 Foreign Affair (1989)
 Wildest Dreams (1996)
 Twenty Four Seven (1999)

Tours
 1977: Tina Turner Tour
 1978: Tina Turner '78 Tour
 1979: Tina Turner Show '79 Tour (Wild Lady of Rock)
 1981–83: Tina Turner Tour (Nice 'n' Rough)
 1984: 1984 World Tour
 1985: Private Dancer World Tour
 1987–1988: Break Every Rule World Tour
 1990: Foreign Affair: The Farewell Tour
 1993: What's Love? Tour
 1996–97: Wildest Dreams Tour
 2000: Twenty Four Seven Tour
 2008–09: Tina!: 50th Anniversary Tour

As opening act
 1981: The Rolling Stones American Tour 1981 
 1981: Worth Leavin' Home For Tour 
 1984: Can't Slow Down Tour

Filmography

Books
 I, Tina: My Life Story (1986)
 My Love Story: A Memoir, Atria Books (2018)
 Happiness Becomes You: A Guide to Changing Your Life for Good, Atria Books (2020)
 Tina Turner: That's My Life

Notes

References

Bibliography

External links

 Official website
 Tina Turner & Ike Relationship
 
 Ike & Tina Turner on Rock Hall
 Image of Tina Turner and Lionel Richie posing with their Grammy Awards in Los Angeles, California, 1985. Los Angeles Times Photographic Archive (Collection 1429). UCLA Library Special Collections, Charles E. Young Research Library, University of California, Los Angeles.

 
1939 births
Living people
20th-century American actresses
20th-century African-American women singers
21st-century American actresses
21st-century African-American women singers
Actresses from St. Louis
Actresses from Tennessee
African-American actresses
African-American choreographers
African-American female dancers
African-American rock singers
American Buddhists
American choreographers
American rhythm and blues singers
American autobiographers
American contraltos
American emigrants to Switzerland
American women pop singers
American pop rock singers
American women rock singers
American film actresses
American soul singers
American television actresses
Baptists from Tennessee
Capitol Records artists
Converts to Buddhism from Protestantism
EMI Records artists
Former United States citizens
Grammy Lifetime Achievement Award winners
Ike & Tina Turner members
Kennedy Center honorees
Kidney transplant recipients
Kings of Rhythm members
Members of Sōka Gakkai
Naturalised citizens of Switzerland
Nichiren Buddhists
Parlophone artists
People from Brownsville, Tennessee
People from Haywood County, Tennessee
People from Küsnacht
People from View Park–Windsor Hills, California
Musicians from Zürich
People named in the Panama Papers
Performers of Buddhist music
Pompeii Records artists
Singers from Missouri
Singers from Tennessee
Sonja Records artists
Swiss Buddhists
Swiss television actresses
United Artists Records artists
Virgin Records artists
Women autobiographers